Yankee Pasha may refer to:
Yankee Pasha (novel), a historical novel by Edison Marshall published in 1947
Yankee Pasha (film), a 1954 film by based on the novel